Nikolai Pavlovich Schmidt (Russian: Николай Павлович Шмит; 22 December 1883 – 26 February 1907) was a Russian revolutionary aligned with the Bolsheviks. He was arrested in October 1905 during the 1905 Revolution. He apparently committed suicide in suspicious circumstances whilst in prison expecting imminent release. Others researchers claimed that he was intentionally killed. Before that he was tortured in order to obtain self-evidence against him on his role in 1905 Revolution.

Schmidt was the nephew of Savva Morozov. His father Pavel Aleksandrovich Schmidt married Vera Vikulovna Morozova, the heiress of a rich Old Believer family. Both he and his uncle were sympathetic to the Bolsheviks and provided funds for their newspaper, Novaya Zhizn.

References

1883 births
1907 deaths
Russian revolutionaries
Russian Social Democratic Labour Party members
Bolshevik finance
1907 suicides
Suicides in Russia
People who committed suicide in prison custody